Scythropiodes ussuriella is a moth in the family Lecithoceridae. It was described by Alexandr L. Lvovsky in 1996. It is found in Korea and the Russian Far East (south-eastern Siberia).

The wingspan is about 22 mm. Adults are similar to Odites malivora, but the hindwings are more greyish.

References

Moths described in 1996
Scythropiodes